The East Temple is a prominent  summit composed of Navajo Sandstone in Zion National Park, in Washington County of southwest Utah, United States. It is one of the notable landmarks in the park. The nearest neighbor is Twin Brothers, one-half mile to the north, and the nearest higher peak is The West Temple,  to the west-southwest. The mountain is situated 1.8 miles northeast of the park headquarters, at the confluence of Pine Creek and the North Fork Virgin River. This feature's name was applied by John Wesley Powell during his explorations in 1872, and was officially adopted in 1934 by the U.S. Board on Geographic Names. The first ascent was made in 1937 by Glen Dawson, Dick Jones, Homer Fuller, Wayland Gilbert, and Jo Momyer.

Climbing Routes
Climbing Routes on The East Temple
 Casual Route -  - 4 pitches
 Fang Spire -  - 5 pitches
 Lovelace -  - 9 pitches
 Cowboy Bob Goes to Zion -  - 10 pitches
 Mobius -  - 5 pitches

Climate
Spring and fall are the most favorable seasons to visit The East Temple. According to the Köppen climate classification system, it is located in a Cold semi-arid climate zone, which is defined by the coldest month having an average mean temperature below 32 °F (0 °C), and at least 50% of the total annual precipitation being received during the spring and summer.

Gallery

See also

 Geology of the Zion and Kolob canyons area
 Colorado Plateau

References

External links

Zion National Park National Park Service
 Weather forecast: The East Temple

Mountains of Utah
Zion National Park
Mountains of Washington County, Utah
Colorado Plateau
North American 2000 m summits